The Secret Circle is an American supernatural fantasy teen drama television series that aired on The CW from September 15, 2011, to May 10, 2012. It is based on the book series of the same name written by L.J. Smith. Set in the fictional town of Chance Harbor, Washington, the series focuses on Cassie Blake who, after moving to the town, discovers that she is a hereditary witch and becomes the sixth member of a secret coven. The series was developed by Andrew Miller and was picked up by The CW on May 17, 2011. On October 12, The CW ordered a full 22-episode season.

The CW canceled the series on May 11, 2012. Ratings had declined in the second half of the season; the high costs of special effects and location shooting were also cited as reasons for the cancellation.

Synopsis
Following her mother's death in a tragic fire, orphaned highschooler Cassie Blake (Britt Robertson) moves to Chance Harbor, Washington, to live with her grandmother. Her plans to adjust to her new life are made more complicated when five of her classmates—Adam Conant (Thomas Dekker), Diana Meade (Shelley Hennig), Faye Chamberlain (Phoebe Tonkin), Melissa Glaser (Jessica Parker Kennedy), and Nick Armstrong (Louis Hunter)—recognize her as a witch and invite her to join their coven, the Circle. With her, they can unlock the full extent of their powers. Initially, Cassie refuses to believe that she is a witch, even after Adam helps her to unlock her powers. It is only after she discovers an old leather-bound book of spells left to her by her late mother, Amelia, that she begins to accept her power. Inside the book is a message from Amelia explaining that she kept secret their real family history and her powers in order to keep Cassie safe. As the Circle soon finds out, the witches' powers attract dark and dangerous forces that constantly put them in harm's way.

Main cast

Circle members
 Britt Robertson as Cassie Blake, a newly-revealed witch who moved to Chance Harbor after the death of her mother, Amelia. Initially disliking the idea of being a witch, she soon begins to accept her destiny and her family's magical heritage. Her mother's line goes back to the beginning of witchcraft, while her father, John Blackwell, comes from a similarly long line of dark witches. Through Blackwell, she is Diana's elder half-sister.
 Thomas Dekker as Adam Conant, a natural-born witch and one of the two male members of the Circle. He and Cassie are instantly attracted to each other, which puts a strain on Adam's longstanding relationship with Diana. It is Adam who helps Cassie unlock her powers and encourages her to join the Circle.
 Phoebe Tonkin as Faye Chamberlain, an eccentric and free-spirited witch who uses her powers recklessly and selfishly. Frequently brash and irresponsible, she often challenges authority. In particular, she resents Diana's presumption of being Circle leader, and is jealous that Diana found her family's Book of Shadows before she has found hers. She is best friends with Melissa.
 Shelley Hennig as Diana Meade, the responsible but sometimes bossy leader of the Circle. She becomes good friends with Cassie, despite the attraction between Cassie and Diana's long-term boyfriend, Adam Conant. She was the first member of the Circle to discover witchcraft and—before Cassie found hers—the only member to have found her family's Book of Shadows. She is Cassie's younger half-sister through their father, John Blackwell. She has dark magic and Balcoin blood.
 Jessica Parker Kennedy as Melissa Glaser, the fourth female witch of the Circle. She is Faye's closest friend and Nick's girlfriend. Compared to her coven-mates, she is quieter and tends to keep her opinions to herself, but she is responsible and loyal to the Circle.
 Louis Hunter as Nick Armstrong, the second male member of the Circle. He and Melissa are in a relationship that he is reluctant to make anything more than sexual. After a warning from Faye, he begins to treat Melissa with more respect and their relationship improves. Early on in the series he is possessed by a demon and is then drowned by Charles Meade and Dawn Chamberlain in an attempt to kill the demon. He is resurrected by the witch hunters later in an attempt to steal the family crystals but eventually dies again.

Others
 Gale Harold as Charles Meade, Diana's father and a member of the previous generation of the Circle. Following the fire at the boat yard, his powers—along with those of the surviving members of his Circle—were stripped from him. It is he who in episode 1 kills Cassie's mother, using the magical power of a crystal so that she will return to Chance Harbor and join the circle. He then later drowns Nick Armstrong to kill the demon that was possessing him. Nick's death affects him heavily after this. 
 Ashley Crow as Jane Blake, Cassie's grandmother and Amelia's mother. She initially seems ignorant of witchcraft and the Circle, but Cassie eventually takes the hint and begins regularly seeking her advice.
 Natasha Henstridge as Dawn Chamberlain, is Faye's mother, the principal of Chance Harbor High School and a member of the previous generation of the Circle. She and Charles act as a team, although she is the more sadistic of the two. She prefers, however, to let Charles do the dirty work, such as Amelia's murder.
 Chris Zylka as Jake Armstrong, Nick's elder brother, who returns to the town after Nick's death. By the rules of coven magic, he inherits Nick's place in the coven (which thus remains bound). Believing witchcraft responsible for the death of his parents, he initially works for a group of witch hunters. However, he eventually finds out that it was the witch hunters who killed his parents. He shows an interest in Cassie, but he and Faye establish a relationship which is maintained through the remainder of the series.

Recurring cast
 Logan Browning as Sally Matthews, a girl who befriends Cassie. She butts heads with Faye, who accidentally kills her when her power is unexpectedly strong. Dawn manages to revive her with a crystal, leaving her with a broken arm. She then becomes suspicious of the Circle members, especially after they left the hallway a mess from using their powers, but still tries to be friends with Cassie. She last appears in episode 3 ("Loner").
 Zachary Abel as Luke, a friend of Adam's who is attracted to Cassie when she first arrives. Through Adam, he asks her to the school dance, but amicably accepts her decision when she ditches him. In episode 7 ("Masked"), he is asked to attend a Halloween party at Cassie's house, organized by Faye, and is revealed to be a witch hunter.
 Adam Harrington as Ethan Conant, Adam's father. An alcoholic, he owns the Boathouse Bar and Grill where Adam works. Like Charles and Dawn, he was stripped of his powers sixteen years prior to the series' beginning. He continually complains about how he never was with Amelia, despite their relationship being "written in the stars", and misses her more than he misses Adam's mother. Eventually, he tells Diana that Adam is destined to be with Cassie, causing their breakup. Later he stops drinking, realizing he needs to be a better father. He has a rivalry with Charles, mentioning multiple times that he has always been a bully. He also hates John Blackwell, at one point trying to kill him. He last appears in episode 16 ("Lucky").
 Emily Holmes as Amelia Blake, Cassie's mother (in her first appearance). She is killed by Charles in episode 1 in order to bring Cassie back to Chance Harbor.
 Andrea Brooks as Amelia Blake (in her second appearance). She is mentioned throughout the series. She was a member of the previous generation of the Circle, and was John Blackwell's girlfriend: she let him into the Circle, but left him once she realized who he was. She stopped the demons Blackwell summoned at the boatyard fire, and was stripped of her powers along with Charles, Dawn, and Ethan. In a flashback, it is revealed that she knew Blackwell was also Diana's father.
 JR Bourne as Isaac, a high-ranking member of the witch hunters. Jake reports to him regularly: even after leaving the witch hunters, Jake still seems to have some respect for him. He arrives in Chance Harbor in episode 6 ("Wake") and leaves in episode 9 ("Balcoin"); he later returns, however, to get Balcoin's medallion from Jake, showing that, at least to some extent, he reciprocates Jake's respect. His faction of the witch hunters is called the "True Believers".
 Richard Harmon as Ian, a witch hunter. He first appears in episode 7 ("Masked"), trying to kill the Circle. He reappears in episode 20 ("Traitor"), having returned to Chance Harbor in Isaac's place (although only out of respect for Isaac) to warn the Circle about a witch who has given power to the witch hunters.
 Sammi Rotibi as Eben, the leader of the witch hunters who will do anything to kill them, especially John Blackwell. Sixteen years prior to the events of the series, he used Ethan Conant's power to try to kill Blackwell, but failed. That day he personally killed Jake and Nick's parents. When Blackwell returns, Eben summons demons into himself to protect him and to aid him in killing witches, causing a rift with Isaac and other witch hunters.
 Nina Kiri as Lucy Gibbons (in her first appearance), John Blackwell's psychic sixteen years ago, who was at the boatyard on the night of the fire. She seeks Cassie out to warn her about the witch hunters.
 Lauren Stamile as Lucy Gibbons (in her second appearance). She is revealed to be working for the witch hunters, just as she had been sixteen years ago.
 Tom Butler as Henry Chamberlain, Dawn's father-in-law, Faye's grandfather, and an elder. He comes to Chance Harbor after being called by Ethan Conant, to determine whether or not the next generation is practicing. Dawn kills him after he says he will alert the elders. Charles then hides his body at his house, twice, but it is eventually found.
 Stepfanie Kramer as Kate Meade, Charles' mother, Diana's grandmother, and an elder. She becomes suspicious when Diana tells her Charles and Dawn are dating, and confronts Dawn. Dawn later puts on a facade, possibly attempting to poison her, causing a rift with Charles. She tries to kill Cassie to destroy her dark magic but fails, and informs Charles that she knows what he has done. She returns in episode 22 ("Family"), to gift her power to Charles and Dawn to save the children.
 Hiro Kanagawa as Calvin Wilson, the owner of Chance Harbor's antique store and a witch from another Circle. He realizes Cassie has dark magic and tries to warn her, but is stopped by Jake. He later appears as a hallucination to Jake when he is sick.
 Joe Lando as John Blackwell, Cassie's father, and a witch with dark magic. He returns to Chance Harbor after Cassie uses his medallion to contact him. He is revealed to be Diana's biological father, from an affair when Charles and his wife were separated. His intentions remain unclear until the final episodes. It is revealed that he fathered Cassie and Diana, and caused the Circle's female members to become pregnant by their boyfriends and then go to the boatyard—which he knew was a trap—in order to make their children orphans whom he could manipulate to form his own circle of dark magic. He also had an affair and planned to have a child with Dawn, but was thwarted because she was already pregnant with Faye. His plans are ultimately stopped by Cassie and Diana.
 Grey Damon as Lee LaBeque, a practitioner of voodoo magic. Faye tracks him down in an attempt to get her solo magic back. He does some things, but they all have consequences Faye dislikes, and she believes he is using her. In fact, he is using her magic to revive his girlfriend who is in a coma. Nevertheless, he and Faye develop feelings for one another.
 Alexia Fast as Eva, Lee's girlfriend, who is in a coma. She later awakens and gains some of Faye's power due to Lee's voodoo magic.
 Michael Graziadei as Callum, a friend of Lee's and a drug dealer who sells Devil's Spirit. He realizes that Faye and Melissa are witches after a party and an argument with Lee. In episode 19 ("Crystal"), he attempts to steal one of the crystals, but the Circle stops him and "marks" him, ordering him to never return to Chance Harbor.
 Tim Phillipps as Grant, an Australian who comes to Chance Harbor by boat. He and Diana instantly develop a mutual attraction, but problems arise because he has lied to her about owning the boat (he just works on it), and because she is a witch. He offers to take her with him, away from Chance Harbor.

Guest cast
 Dave Baez as Zachary Larson, a former friend of Amelia's who knew about the Circle. After the fire at the boat yard, he blamed Amelia and the Circle for what happened to his girlfriend, Heather. He became a fisherman, and returns to Chance Harbor occasionally. After discovering that Cassie has returned to town, he attempts to stop the Circle by killing one of its members. The Circle defeats him, and Charles and Dawn then "mark" him, forcing him to stay away from the children.
 Camille Sullivan as Heather Barnes, a former friend of Amelia's and Zachary's ex-girlfriend. At the boatyard she was possessed by a demon, and Amelia paralyzed her to prevent it from causing harm. Cassie and Faye try to help her, without fully understanding the situation.
 Ben Cotton as Wade Barnes, Heather's brother, who takes care of her while she is paralyzed.
 Brett Dier as Kyle, the captain of the Chance Harbor High School hockey team. He flirts with Faye and Melissa, but has a girlfriend.
 Marcus Rosner as Richard Armstrong, Jake and Nick's father. He died sixteen years prior to the events of the series, but appears in a flashback of the boatyard fire.
 Cindy Busby as Sara Armstrong, Jake and Nick's mother and Richard's wife. She died at the boatyard fire, but appears in a flashback.
 John de Lancie as Royce Armstrong, Richard's father, Jake and Nick's grandfather, and an elder. He is a conspiracy theorist who lives alone and is considered crazy. When Cassie, Faye and Jake try to find his crystal, he tells them where it is, and reveals a theory that Blackwell actually wanted children from the Circle, and caused all their births. His theory is supported by the fact that the Circle members (except Jake) were born one month apart. He later sends Jake a bottle with beads in it, along with a message that the Circles are coming together and his fight is not yet over—although it is unknown why, or what it means. His theories turn out to be true, and he appears to be a very powerful witch, to the point of being able to make spells that counter dark magic.
 Chad Willett as James Conant, Ethan's father, Adam's grandfather, and an elder. He died prior to the events of the series, but appears in a flashback of the night of the boatyard fire. He is shown to have given Amelia his family's crystal to protect herself. She told him the truth about Blackwell, gave the crystal back to him and asked him to tell Ethan that she didn't love him anymore, although they both knew she was lying. He had an affinity for cloaking spells, which Adam inherited.
 Elise Gatien as Elizabeth Meade, Charles' wife and Diana's mother. She died on the night of the boatyard fire, but appears in a flashback. Though married to Charles, she and Blackwell had an affair while she and her husband were separated, and she knew he was Diana's biological father. After seeing Blackwell for what he was, she returned to Charles, but never told him the truth about Diana. When Amelia tried to persuade her not to go to the boatyard, she refused, blaming Amelia for bringing Blackwell into the Circle.
 Arlen Escarpeta as Holden, Melissa's cousin, possibly a witch, on whom Diana once had a crush.
 Luisa D'Oliveira as Simone, a witch hunter who comes to Chance Harbor along with Jake and Isaac to destroy the Circle. She immediately attempts to kill Cassie.
 Chad Rook as Samuel, a witch hunter who knows Jake. He arrives in Chance Harbor to assist the Circle after being betrayed by Eben.

Episodes

Development

On October 28, 2010, L.J. Smith announced that the series had been optioned for a TV series by The CW. On February 8, 2011, The CW picked up The Secret Circle with Dawson's Creek creator and The Vampire Diaries co-creator/executive producer Kevin Williamson now attached. However, he told The CW that The Vampire Diaries companion series he was helming had been put on hold in order to focus on The Secret Circle. Williamson worked on an original script penned by Andrew Miller, creator of the Emmy-nominated web series Imaginary Bitches, with writer credit shared by both men.
On February 16, 2011, The Secret Circle booked Liz Friedlander to direct the pilot. Friedlander also directed episodes for The Vampire Diaries, Pretty Little Liars, 90210 and One Tree Hill.

On October 12, 2011, The CW ordered a full season of twenty-two episodes. On May 11, 2012 The CW cancelled the series.

Broadcast

Streaming
The series is available to stream on The CW's free digital-only network, CW Seed.

Reception

Critical reception
The pilot has been met with mixed reviews, with Metacritic giving a score of 55 out of a 100 based on 20 critics. Lloyd Roberts of the Los Angeles Times thought the pilot was "splendidly rendered; effective in the expected ways in a way that makes you forget you expected them." He then wrote "Director Liz Friedlander aims not just for creepiness but for a tremulous sense of beauty that reflects the heightened sensibilities and hair-trigger sensitivities of adolescence" and appreciated the actors "who are good to look at, but also bring a little soul to their roles."

In 2015, three years following the cancellation of the show, Gavin Hetherington of SpoilerTV looked back on the series finale, as well as the series as a whole. He reviewed the show favorably, commenting "the last several episodes really built up the potential of the show and made it pretty exciting, and it would have led into an awesome second season", and saying that the show should have had a second season, "to further develop the characters and the storylines we were left hanging with".

Phoebe Tonkin's performance was well received by critics; she was featured on Variety's list of new faces to watch and named one of 2011 Breakout TV Stars by E! Online.

Cancellation and fan campaign
On May 11, 2012, the CW cancelled the series, despite being the network's third-highest rated performer. Following the show's cancellation, a formal fan-led campaign website titled 'Save The Circle' was launched. A letter-writing campaign, targeted at the CW, aimed to encourage the CW to reconsider bringing back the show for a mid-season slot. Campaigns were also launched at other TV networks whose target demographic matched those of The CW—MTV, ABC Family, and Syfy. 
Fans donated between $1–10 to the Make a Wish Foundation in the name of MTV; this aimed to attach a good cause to the campaign while getting MTV's attention. The Secret Circle executive producer Andrew Miller auctioned a signed poster of the show's cast in support of the campaign. In the end, over $7,000 was raised. The campaign targeted at ABC Family asked fans to donate money to fund a delivery of 325,000 golden plastic coins to the network's headquarters. The coins were symbolic of a 'cloaking coin' that belonged to one of the main characters, Adam Conant's grandfather in the episode "Traitor". The metaphor was that The CW 'cloaked' the show by cancelling it, and fans wanted ABC Family to 'uncloak' the show by picking it up.

A letter-writing campaign to Syfy was also launched, but ultimately the 'Save The Circle' campaign leaders decided against pursuing the network further due to budgetary concerns. Following the announcement that Warner Bros. had unsuccessfully entered talks with ABC Family about picking up the show and that the series would not be shipped to another network, campaigning targeting potential networks for a pick-up ceased.
Nevertheless, a new campaign, aimed at Warner Bros, was launched following the announcement that the series' first season would not be released on DVD or Blu-ray. As of September 2012, The Secret Circle is available on Netflix for immediate streaming. A music project was launched, with the aim of developing and distributing a full-length album of 10 fan songs online and making them available for free download. Fans were asked to either submit an audio recording of themselves singing their own songs, or send in lyrics for potential use. Petitions were also set up, in the hope that they would bring back the series. The three main campaigns together, as of June 24, 2012, amassed over 85,500 signatures. Since the show was canceled, fans have voted it "the show that will be missed most" or "Most Shocking Cancellation" in a number of polls, including E!, Clique Clack, Hypable, Spoiler TV, TV Fanatic, TV.com, and Zap2it.

Awards and nominations

References

External links
 
 
 The Secret Circle at Alloy Entertainment
 

2011 American television series debuts
2012 American television series endings
2010s American high school television series
2010s American horror television series
2010s American supernatural television series
2010s American teen drama television series
The CW original programming
English-language television shows
American fantasy television series
Dark fantasy television series
Television about magic
Serial drama television series
Television shows based on American novels
Television series by Alloy Entertainment
Television series by CBS Studios
Television series by Warner Bros. Television Studios
Television shows set in Washington (state)
Television shows filmed in Vancouver
Television series about witchcraft
American fantasy drama television series
Television series about teenagers